Stephen Stapper (fl. 1414) or Stepper, of Reading, Berkshire, was an English politician.

Family
Stapper was probably the son of MP, William Stapper.

Career
He was a Member (MP) of the Parliament of England for Reading in November 1414.

References

Year of birth missing
15th-century deaths
English MPs November 1414
Members of the Parliament of England (pre-1707) for Reading